Janusz Nawrocki (born 8 July 1961) is a retired Polish football defender. Besides Poland, he has played in Austria.

References

1965 births
Living people
Polish footballers
Wisła Kraków players
GKS Katowice players
FC Admira Wacker Mödling players
GKS Tychy players
Ruch Chorzów players
Association football defenders
Poland international footballers
Ekstraklasa players
Polish expatriate footballers
Expatriate footballers in Austria
Polish expatriate sportspeople in Austria
Footballers from Kraków